No Way to Treat a Lady is the seventh studio album by Australian-American pop singer Helen Reddy that was released in the summer of 1975 by Capitol Records and found Reddy tackling country pop ("You Don't Need a Reason"), bossa nova ("Ten to Eight") and blues ("Long Time Looking"). The album debuted on Billboard'''s Top LP's & Tapes chart in the issue dated July 12, 1975, and peaked at number 11 over the course of 34 weeks, and on the album chart in Canada's RPM magazine it got as high as number 13. On January 19, 1976, the Recording Industry Association of America awarded the album with Gold certification for sales of 500,000 copies in the United States, and on August 23, 2005, it was released for the first time on compact disc as one of two albums on one CD, the other album being her 1976 release, Music, Music.



Singles
The advance single from the album issued in June 1975 paired the tracks "You Don't Need a Reason" and "Bluebird," the former - written by Alex Harvey who'd penned Reddy's number 1 hit "Delta Dawn" - being the intended A-side. However a week after the single's release Capitol Records with Reddy's husband/manager Jeff Wald issued a statement announcing that "Bluebird" - a Leon Russell composition - would be promoted as the A-side. "Bluebird" would debut on the Billboard's  Hot 100 dated July 5,  with a parallel debut on the magazine's Easy Listening Top 40,  only to become the least successful lead single from a Helen Reddy album since "No Sad Song" from Reddy's second album Helen Reddy peaked at number 62 in 1972. Capitol Records evidently had misgivings about both sides of the advance single from No Way to Treat a Lady, as parallel with the album's June 1975 release the track "Ain't No Way to Treat a Lady" was rush released as a single, with "Bluebird" resultantly stalling at number 35 on the Hot 100 to drop off that chart after only six weeks. "Bluebird" did manage to rise as high as number 5 the Top Ten on the Billboard Easy Listening Top 40 in an eight week chart tenure, and was also a minor hit in both Canada (number 51) and New Zealand (number 40). Despite its statistically low profile in her repertoire, "Bluebird" would be spoken of fondly by Reddy: "I love Leon Russell's writing and I love this song. It was an integral part of my repertoire for nearly 30 years, and I never tired of singing it."

The second single "Ain't No Way to Treat a Lady" - which was "written by the talented Harriet Schock, a fine singer in her own right, [and] really struck a nerve with many listeners" - debuted on the Billboard Hot 100 dated August 9, 1975, rising as high as number 8 in its 16 week chart tenure. After debuting on the Easy Listening Top 40 dated August 23, "Ain't No Way..." would become the seventh of Reddy's eight number 1 Easy Listening hits, with a chart tenure of 11 weeks. On the Canadian hit parade as ranked by RPM, "Ain't No Way..." rose as high as #2 making it Reddy's highest charting Canadian hit after "I am Woman" and "Delta Dawn", both of which reached the #1 position on the RPM chart (from which "Ain't No Way..." was kept first by "Third Rate Romance" by the Amazing Rhythm Aces and then by "I'm Sorry" by John Denver). "Ain't No Way..." was also a hit (#12) in New Zealand and became Reddy's final chart item in her native Australia at #94. The song also earned Reddy her final Grammy nomination, in the category of Best Pop Vocal Performance, Female (the category would be won by Janis Ian for "At Seventeen").No Way to Treat a Lady became Reddy's first album to yield a third single release when "Somewhere in the Night" was issued November 17, 1975 to debut November 29 on the Easy Listening Top 40 where its tenure was 14-weeks with a number 2 peak. Debuting on the Hot 100 of December 6, "Somewhere in the Night" would peak at number 19 in a 14-week tenure.  No Way to Treat a Lady'' would be Reddy's last album to yield more than one Top 40 hit. In Canada "Somewhere in the Night" charted with a number 27 peak. "Barry Manilow also recorded this song but graciously conceded that he thought my version was better," said Reddy. "I don't think it possible for anyone to make a bad recording of such a great tune."

Track listing

Charts

Personnel

Helen Reddy – vocals
Joe Wissert – producer 
Nick DeCaro – arranger and conductor 
Tom Perry – recording engineer
Doug Sax – mastering engineer
Mike Reese – mastering engineer
Jeff Wald – management
Francesco Scavullo – photography
Roy Kohara – art direction

Notes

References

 

1975 albums
Capitol Records albums
Helen Reddy albums
Albums produced by Joe Wissert